Micro entity may refer to:
 A form of legal person in patent law, see Large and small entities in patent law
 Small and medium-sized enterprises#United Kingdom